Angelo Aniello Fiore (died c.1500, Naples) was an Italian architect and sculptor. He was a contemporary of Gabriele d'Agnolo and Giovanni Francesco Mormando. He was born in Naples and one of his pupils was Novello da San Lucano.

15th-century Italian architects
15th-century Italian sculptors
1500 deaths
15th-century Neapolitan people